The 2022 Toyota U.S. Open Swimming Championships took place from November 30 to December 3, 2022 at Greensboro Aquatic Center in Greensboro, North Carolina, United States. Competition was conducted in a long course (50-meter) pool. Swimmers were allowed to compete representing their country, such as Brazil and Scotland, national swimming federation, such as Swim Ireland, club, such as Wolfpack Elite, or unattached.

Results

Men

Women

World records set

Championships records set

References

External links
 Results
 Results book

Swimming competitions in the United States
2022 in swimming
November 2022 sports events in the United States
December 2022 sports events in the United States
2022 in sports in North Carolina